Shirley Mae Tanner (born May 22, 1934) is an American former film and television actress. She is known for playing the role of "Eileen Sherwood" in the American sitcom television series My Sister Eileen.

Born in Los Angeles, California, the daughter of Theodore Tanner. Bonne began her career in 1955, appearing in the sitcom The People's Choice,  in which she played the role of "Ginny Hondecker". She continued her career mainly appearing in television programs and having uncredited roles in films, in which Bonne later won the role of “Eileen Sherwood” in the new CBS sitcom My Sister Eileen, in 1960. She replaced actress, Anne Helm.

Bonne guest-starred in episodes of various television programs, including Bonanza, Star Trek: The Original Series, Mr. Novak, Mannix, That Girl and The Joey Bishop Show. She retired from acting in 1970, making her final appearance being in an I Dream of Jeannie.  Bonne retired to Palm Springs, California.

References

External links 
 
 

1934 births
20th-century American actresses
21st-century American women
Actresses from Los Angeles
American film actresses
American television actresses
Living people